Carla is an album by the bassist Steve Swallow, released on the Xtra Watt label in 1987.

Reception

AllMusic's review by Scott Yanow states: "The post-bop music is reasonably unpredictable and, although not essential, holds one's interest".

Track listing
All compositions by Steve Swallow.
 "Deep Trouble" - 6:09
 "Crab Alley" - 3:46
 "Fred and Ethel" - 4:55
 "Read My Lips" - 4:53
 "Afterglow" - 6:01
 "Hold It Against Me" - 5:37
 "Count the Ways" - 3:48
 "Last Night" - 5:42

Personnel
Steve Swallow - bass guitar, keyboards
Larry Willis - piano 
Carla Bley - organ, additional keyboards
Hiram Bullock - guitar
Victor Lewis - drums
Don Alias - percussion
Ida Kavafian - violin
Ikwhan Bae - viola
Fred Sherry - cello

References

Steve Swallow albums
1987 albums